Bricindera or Brikindera was an ancient town on the island of Rhodes. It was a member of the Delian League since it is mentioned in the records of tributes to ancient Athens for 429/8 BCE, 421/0 BCE, when it paid a phoros of a talent, and 415/4 BCE. It is also mentioned in a mime of Herodas of the 3rd century BCE.

Its site is unlocated.

References

Populated places in the ancient Aegean islands
Former populated places in Greece
Ancient Rhodes
Lost ancient cities and towns
Greek city-states
Members of the Delian League